Brenning is a surname. Notable people with the surname include:

Bob Brenning (1932–1959), Australian rugby league player
Tomas Brenning (born 1967), Swedish bridge player, journalist, and computer programmer